The 2015 West Dorset District Council election was held on Thursday 7 May 2015 to elect councillors to West Dorset District Council in England. It took place on the same day as the general election other district council elections in the United Kingdom. A series of boundary changes saw the number of councillors reduced from 48 to 44.

These were the final elections of the district council, before its abolition on 1 April 2019 when it was merged with the other districts of Dorset and Dorset County Council to form a new unitary authority Dorset Council.

The 2015 election saw the Conservatives maintain majority control of the council taking 30 of the 44 seats up for election.

Overall results

Ward results

Beaminster

Bridport North

Bridport South

Broadmayne & Crossways

Broadwindsor

Burton Bradstock

Cerne Valley

Chickerell & Chesil Bank

Chideock & Symondsbury

Dorchester East

Dorchester North

Dorchester South

Dorchester West

Frome Valley

Lyme Regis & Charmouth

Maiden Newton

Netherbury

Piddle Valley

Puddletown

Queen Thorne

Sherborne East

Sherborne West

Winterborne St Martin

Yetminster & Cam Vale

By-elections between 2015 and 2019

Piddle Valley
A by-election was held for the Piddle Valley ward of West Dorset County Council on 13 April 2017 following the resignation of Conservative councillor Peter Hiscock.

Lyme Regis & Charmouth
A by-election was held for one of the two seats in the Lyme Regis & Charmouth ward of West Dorset County Council on 14 September 2017 following the resignation of Conservative councillor George Symonds.

References
General
 

Specific

2015 English local elections
May 2015 events in the United Kingdom
2015
2010s in Dorset